Organización Deportiva Bolivariana (ODEBO; English: Bolivarian Sport Organization) is a sports organization based in South America. It organizes the Bolivarian Games.

History

The idea of creating a Bolivarian sports organization came to mind to the region's country leaders during the 1936 Berlin Olympic Games. Alberto Nariño Cheyne, Colombia's national director for sports, was at the forefront of the project. The ODEBO was created on 16 August 1938 by the Olympic committees of Bolivia, Colombia, Ecuador, Panama, Peru and Venezuela. Its creation was inaugurated at the Cundinamarca Palace in Bogota. Its headquarters opened in Caracas. The first Bolivarian Games were organized in 1938, the year of the organization's creation.

In May 2010, the ODEBO admitted Chile as a member of the organization. In February 2011, the ODEBO created the Bolivarian Beach Games and organized the first edition in Lima in 2012.

Members
Members of the National Olympic Committees include:

References

External website
 

Bolivarian Games
Sports governing bodies in North America
Sports governing bodies in South America
Sports organizations established in 1938